Olainfarm AS is a Latvian leading manufacturer in the chemical and pharmaceutical sector of the Baltic States.

The company was founded in 1972 as state enterprise "Olaines ķīmiski – farmaceitiskā rūpnīca" (Olaine Chemical-Pharmaceutical Plant). The main goal of founding the company was to ensure pharmaceutical substances and intermediates to several finished drug form manufacturing plants in the Soviet Union. As a result of privatization in 1997, the company was reorganized into a joint stock company, and its shares were listed on stock exchange.

Olainfarm produces over 60 final dosage forms, 25 active pharmaceutical ingredients and 20 intermediates. The product portfolio is well diversified with the main emphasis on branded products, historically unique to Olainfarm. The key areas of specialization in final dosage forms include neurology (cholinesterase inhibitors, anxiolytics, psychostimulants, nootropics), cardiology (antiarrhythmics, energy metabolism enhancers), infectology (original nitrofurantoine derivatives and antivirals) and allergology (fast acting antihistamines).

Olainfarm is certified in accordance with the requirements of the EU GMP for APIs and FDFs, the U.S. cGMP for certain APIs (FDA), TGA for FDFs (Australia), CEP for certain APIs, ISO 14001 Environmental Management System and ISO 17025 Laboratory Management System.

Proof of the high quality of the Olainfarm products is cooperation with such global and regionally acknowledged companies as Novartis, Dr. Reddy's, Glenmark Generics, Sigma AU, Almirall Ranke, UQUIFA, MIAT, Actavis, Teva, Egis, PHF and many others. Since 2011 Olainfarm supplies anti-tuberculosis medication to the World Health Organization.

Patron of the University of Latvia 
Olainfarm is a silver patron of the University of Latvia Foundation. Supports the University of Latvia since 2012 by donating scholarships to pharmacy students of the Faculty of Chemistry and the Faculty of Medicine of the University of Latvia, as well as for the course of exact events.

Representative offices in Russia, Ukraine, Belarus, Tajikistan, Albania, Armenia, Kazakhstan, Kosovo, Uzbekistan and Mongolia, subsidiaries in Latvia, Lithuania, Belarus, Russia, Turkey, Azerbaijan and Kyrgyzstan, and contracted agents in the USA, Serbia, Turkmenistan, Moldova, Sweden and Southeast Asia.

Olainfarm exports to more than 50 countries worldwide, export share is near 85%. Main export markets are Russia, Ukraine, Belarus, The Netherlands, Kazakhstan, UK and Poland. Farthest export market – Australia.

History 
On 4 December 1965, the Council of Ministers of the Latvian Soviet Socialist Republic adopted a decision on construction of a chemical-pharmaceutical factory in the town of Olaine.

In 1968, the construction of the factory was commenced.

The first operation of furagin synthesis was carried out on 10 October 1972. That day is considered as the day of commencement of the operation of the company, which at that time was named Olaines ķīmiski-farmaceitiskā rūpnīca (Olaine Chemical-Pharmaceutical Plant).

In 1976, Olaine Chemical-Pharmaceutical Plant became the leading manufacturer in Latvbiofarm association. The production capacity of the enterprise made it possible to supply all the existing factories-manufacturers in the territory of the Soviet Union with active chemical ingredients and intermediates of corresponding groups.

In 1980, synthesis of 15 products was developed. After a while, the management of the enterprise made a decision to produce also finished forms of medicaments.

In 1991 Latvia restores its independence after being occupied by the Soviet Union. These changes affected also the operation of Olaine Chemical-Pharmaceutical Plant; therefore, a decision was made to develop the strongest lines of synthesis (adamantine, quinuclidinone, and other derivatives) for selling products to Western countries.

State enterprise Olaine Chemical-Pharmaceutical Plant was privatized in 1997. As a result of the privatization, the enterprise was reorganized into the joint stock company Olainfarm, and its shares were listed on the secondary list of Riga Stock Exchange.

In 2001, after successful audits conducted by such well-known companies as Cilag (Switzerland), Johnson & Johnson (USA) and Sanofi (France), the Company entered the global market as its actual participant in production of active chemical ingredients.

In 2002, certificate was obtained according to the inspection requirements of the U.S. Food and Drug Administration (FDA).

From 2003 to 2004 grandiose reconstruction of the manufacturing plant was finished in compliance with the requirements of Good Manufacturing Practice of the European Union.

On 30 July 2004, JSC Olainfarm obtained a Good Manufacturing Practice certificate of compliance. This certificate symbolized the start of a new period in the company's history.

In 2005, Shareholders of JSC Olainfarm decided on increasing the fixed capital of the company by 3 million Lats, to 13.25 million Lats.

In 2006, Considering the positive development dynamics of the company and the quality of investor relations, shares of the company were transferred to the most prestigious Main List of the Baltics. Popular anti-virus preparation Remantadīns® (Remantadine) was registered as the first of the company's manufactured medicaments in Poland.

In 2007, JSC Olainfarm received the Baltic Stock Exchange award for the best investor relations on the Internet in 2007.

In 2008, JSC Olainfarm opened a representation office in Vietnam and started an ambitious sale promotion programme in important sales markets.

At the award ceremony of newspaper Dienas bizness for Top 500 most successful companies in Latvia, in 2009 JSC Olainfarm received the special award from NASDAQ OMX Riga as the company of the stock exchange with the highest share price increase from early 2009 to 1 November. The company's share price in 2009 increased by 160%.

In 2010, The Company registered its representation offices in Serbia and Tajikistan. The first registered product in Serbia was anti-virus preparation Remavir®.

In 2011, When the sales promotion programme, which started in 2008, showed significant results, the Company set even higher new records of profit and turnover. For the first time in its history, the company's shareholders decided to pay dividends in the amount of 10% from the previous year profit. Olainfarm started building its own chain of pharmacies Latvijas aptieka.

In 2013, Olainfarm acquired controlling stake in the leading Latvian food supplement company Silvanols.

In 2014, Olainfarm won the Export Champion 2014 Award at the competition is organized by the Latvian Economics Ministry and the Investment and Development Agency of Latvia (LIAA).

On 13 January 2015, JSC Olainfarm opened the new finished drug manufacturing plant, which was created with investments of 9.6 million. It consists of a nitrofurane production facility, a production facility of small finished drug series, and a laboratory for the development of finished drug forms.

On 20 January 2016, JSC Olainfarm concludes an agreement on the purchase of 100% of capital shares of the manufacturer of organic cosmetics Kiwi Cosmetics Ltd.
On 28 January, JSC Olainfarm receives an award in the decade nomination "Best 10-year performance" for the biggest share price growth and an increase the Baltic Market Awards ranking. On 12 May 2016, JSC Olainfarm signed an agreement about acquiring 100% shares in Tonus Elast Ltd., producer of elastic medical products.

In 2017, Longgo, a subsidiary of JSC Olainfarm, offering modern natural products for health and well-being was founded on 13 July.

On 21 July, JSC Olainfarm was registered in the Register of Enterprises of the Republic of Latvia as the only owner of LLC Olaines veselības centrs ('Olaine Health Center'). The LLC (renamed OlainMed in January 2018) provides outpatient healthcare services in Olaine.

JSC Olainfarm receives the award from the Employers' Confederation of Latvia (LDDK) as the best employer in the Riga region in 2017. The company also received this award in 2015.

Valērijs Maligins, long-term chairman of the board and main shareholder of JSC Olainfarm, died on 9 December 2017.

In 2018, the producer of products of natural origin, LONGGO, was merged with SIA Silvanols, and on July 6, SIA LONGGO was excluded from the Enterprise Register.

On May 6, 2020, the company SIA Pharma Invest submitted the prospectus of AS Olainfarm's voluntary share buyback offer to the Financial and Capital Market Commission in order to receive permission to acquire a 10% equity stake. The owners of Pharma Invest are Reinis Martinsons (90%) and SIA Prudentia Private Equity Partners (10%).

On June 17, 2021, the management of the company partially changed, Juri Bunduli was elected as the chairman of the board.

In January 2022, AS "Olainfarm" withdrew from the stock exchange.

Subsidiaries and associated companies 
 Latvijas aptieka Ltd., pharmaceutical retail
 Silvanols Ltd., producer of natural food supplement, medical devices and OTC medicines
 Kiwi Cosmetics Ltd., manufacturer of organic cosmetics
 Tonus Elast Ltd., producer of elastic medical products
 Klīnika DiaMed Ltd., private Medical Centre specializing in diagnostics
 NPK Biotest Ltd. (Belarus), producer of natural herbal medicines and food supplements

Governance and management 
Supervisory Council
 Juris Bundulis (Chairperson of the Council)
 Sandis Petrovičs (Deputy Chairperson of the Council)
 Andrejs Leibovičs
 Pēteris Rubenis
 Irina Maligina

Management Board
 Jānis Leimanis
 Raimonds Terentjevs
 Signe Baldere-Sildedze
 Elena Bushberg

References 

 Audited Annual Report 2019

External links 
 Official website

Pharmaceutical companies of Latvia
Pharmaceutical companies established in 1991
Latvian brands
1991 establishments in Latvia
Chemical companies of the Soviet Union
Companies listed on Nasdaq Riga
Pharmaceutical companies of the Soviet Union